Wang Ying is a Chinese actor. He has won the Huabiao Award for Outstanding Actor, 9th Golden Phoenix Award, Golden Rooster Award for Best Supporting Actor, and received the 22nd and 25th China Golden Eagle Awards for Favorite Actor.

Life
Wang was born in Gudangwan of Hangzhou city, Zhejiang province. He studied dance, drama and Yue opera at Zhejiang Art School, Central Hongqi Yue opera Troupe and National Theatre Company of China during his early years.

Personal life
Wang married his first wife, Cheng Yufu, a Peking opera actress, in 1981, they divorced in October 1997.

In 2000, Wang met He Yalin in Yunnan province when he was filming Mao Zedong in 1925, who is a dresser, they married in July 2002.

Works

Film

Television

Awards

References

External links

1957 births
Living people
Male actors from Hangzhou
Male actors from Zhejiang
20th-century Chinese male actors
21st-century Chinese male actors
Chinese male stage actors
Chinese male film actors
Chinese male television actors